Tigrioides antipulvereola is a moth in the family Erebidae. It was described by Jeremy Daniel Holloway in 2001. It is found on Borneo. The habitat consists of lower montane forests and lowland forests.

The length of the forewings is about 11 mm.

References

Moths described in 2001
Lithosiina